Gilgamesh is a 1972 opera by Per Nørgård. First performed in Århus on 4 May 1973. The opera received the Nordic Council Music Prize in 1974.

Recording
 Gilgamesh  Swedish Radio Choir, Swedish Radio Symphony Orchestra, Danish National Symphony Orchestra, Tamas Veto, Oliver Knussen with Voyage into the Golden Screen. Dacapo DCCD 9001.

References

Operas
1972 operas
Operas by Per Nørgård
Danish-language operas
Works based on the Epic of Gilgamesh